Liadytidae is an extinct family of adephagan beetles. There are at least two genera and about seven described species in Liadytidae. They are known from the Early Jurassic to Early Cretaceous of Asia. They are members of the clade Dytiscoidea, and like other members of that group were adapted for aquatic life.

Genera
These two genera belong to the family Liadytidae:
 † Liadytes Ponomarenko, 1963
 † Ovidytes Ren Dong, Zhu Huizhong & Lu Youquan, 1995

References

Adephaga
†
Prehistoric insect families